Royal Oak is a small village in County Carlow, Ireland. It is on the west side of the River Barrow, across from Muine Bheag, and is off the former N9 road (now R448 road from Naas to Waterford). It is not in or a part of Bagenalstown.

Royal Oak is within the townland of Clorusk.

References

See also
 List of towns and villages in Ireland

Towns and villages in County Carlow